Great Expectations is an upcoming period drama developed by Steven Knight. It is based on the novel of the same name by Charles Dickens. It will premiere on BBC One on March 26, 2023. The USA premiere is later the same day on FX on Hulu

Premise
Great Expectations is the coming-of-age story of “Pip,” an orphan who yearns for a greater lot in life, until a twist of fate and the evil machinations of the mysterious and eccentric “Miss Havisham” shows him a dark world of possibilities. Under the great expectations placed upon him, Pip will have to work out the true cost of this new world and whether it will truly make him the man he wishes to be. A damning critique of the class system, Dickens’ novel was published in 1861 after first releasing it in a series of weekly chapters beginning in December 1860.

Cast
Olivia Colman as Miss Havisham
Fionn Whitehead as Pip
Ashley Thomas as Jaggers
Johnny Harris as Magwitch
Shalom Brune-Franklin as Estella
Hayley Squires as Sara
Owen McDonnell as Joe
Trystan Gravelle as Compeyson
Matt Berry as Mr. Pumblechuck

Episodes

Production
It was announced in May 2020 that Steven Knight would develop a television series adaptation of the Charles Dickens novel in collaboration between the BBC and FX, his second after 2019's A Christmas Carol.

In February 2022, the cast for the series was announced, with Olivia Colman cast as Miss Havisham, and Fionn Whitehead cast as Pip. Filming began by March 2022, with production taking place at Buckler's Hard, Hampshire on March 30.

References

External links

2023 British television series debuts
2023 British television series endings
2020s British drama television series
BBC high definition shows
BBC television dramas
FX Networks original programming
2020s British television miniseries
Television series created by Steven Knight
Television series set in the 19th century
Television shows based on Great Expectations
English-language television shows
Television series by Scott Free Productions
Television series by BBC Studios
Upcoming drama television series
Television shows set in Hampshire